Gasana is a Rwandan surname. Notable people with the surname include:

 Anastase Gasana (born 1950), Rwandan political figure and diplomat
 Eric Gasana (born 1986), Rwandan footballer 
 Eugène-Richard Gasana, Rwandan diplomat 
 Kenny Gasana (born 1984), Rwandan basketball player 
 Sammy Gasana (born 1996) , Rwandan Entrepreneur and Artificial intelligence specialist